Rajeev Mehta is an Indian actor working in Hindi TV shows and Bollywood movies. He is well known for his comic role as Praful Parekh in the TV drama Khichdi and as Arvind Thakkar in Baa Bahoo Aur Baby.  His cameo in the cult movie Rangeela as a restaurant steward is also quite popular to this day.

Filmography 
 Pehla Nasha (playback singer - as Rajiv Mehta)

Films

Television

References

External links 
 
 

Indian male film actors
Indian male television actors
Indian male soap opera actors
Male actors in Hindi cinema
Place of birth missing (living people)
Living people
Male actors from Mumbai
1950 births